Cinchonine is an alkaloid found in Cinchona officinalis. It is used in asymmetric synthesis in organic chemistry. It is a stereoisomer and pseudo-enantiomer of cinchonidine.

It is structurally similar to quinine, an antimalarial drug.

References 

Secondary alcohols
Vinyl compounds
Quinoline alkaloids
Quinuclidine alkaloids